State Road 408 (SR 408), officially named the Spessard L. Holland East–West Expressway, is a tolled expressway running east–west through Orlando, Florida, United States. It is owned and operated by the Central Florida Expressway Authority (CFX), except for the westernmost mile (1.5 km), which is owned by Florida's Turnpike Enterprise as a connection to Florida's Turnpike. The road runs from the Turnpike in Gotha, east through downtown Orlando, where it intersects with I-4, ending near SR 50 south of the University of Central Florida. The road is named for Spessard L. Holland.

A short connection to SR 417, originally part of SR 408, was a spur of SR 408, and is sometimes labeled State Road 4080. The spur has been removed and the interchange with SR 417 has been revamped. The right-of-way where SR 408 once ended at SR 50 west of SR 435 (Kirkman Road) was once called State Road 4081. This spur is now a drainage basin.

Route description 

SR 408 begins at Florida's Turnpike, heading east towards West Colonial Drive (SR 50) near Ocoee.  After the interchange with Good Homes Road (exit 3), the tollway passes through the Hiawassee barrier toll, the first of four mainline toll barriers.  From there, SR 408 serpentines eastward through the neighborhoods of Orlo Vista and Pine Hills making major junctions with State Road 435 (Kirkman Road), passing through the Pine Hills barrier toll east of Pine Hills Road, State Road 423 (John Young Parkway), and U.S. Route 441 (Orange Blossom Trail), with the Citrus Bowl being accessible from the Orange Blossom Trail exit. Motorists heading east enter the Orlando city limits at mile marker 8, where they are greeted with a view of the high-rise skyline of Central Orlando. The East–West Expressway passes through a major stack interchange with Interstate 4 in Downtown and proceeds eastward to the Conway Toll Plaza, followed by major junctions with State Road 436 (Semoran Boulevard), and State Road 417 (Central Florida Greeneway). The route continues through the Dean Road Toll Plaza and the exits to State Road 434 (Alafaya Trail) and State Road 50 (East Colonial Drive). The tollway's eastern terminus is Challenger Parkway, however Challenger Parkway continues until Alafaya Trail.

SR 408 runs almost entirely parallel to State Road 50 throughout its entire route.

Tolls 
There are four mainline toll plazas on the tollway. Each of them have at least two express lanes dedicated to E-Pass/SunPass for electronic toll collection which do not require motorists to stop at a booth and lanes dedicated to cash collection.  Excepting the Mills off ramp, which has only two lanes for exact change, the ramp toll plazas have both a lane dedicated to ETC and a lane dedicated to exact change only with no change provided.

The current toll rates took effect in July 2012.

History

Initial segment 
The Orlando-Orange County Expressway Authority had been formed in 1963 for the purpose of building the Bee Line Expressway. In early 1966, while that road was still under construction, Governor Haydon Burns asked the OOCEA to look into an east–west freeway across downtown Orlando to relieve traffic on State Road 50 (Colonial Drive). An engineering study recommended a western terminus at SR 50 west of State Road 435 (Kirkman Road) and an eastern terminus at SR 50 east of Goldenrod Road (State Road 15A). One alternate ran close to SR 50, while the other – which was chosen by June 1969 – ran further south. Bonds were sold in May 1971. In December of that year, the OOCEA voted to name it the Spessard Lindsay Holland East–West Expressway, in honor of Spessard Holland, who had just retired from representing Florida in the U.S. Senate. Groundbreaking was held just east of Semoran Boulevard on February 5, 1972.

The final design took SR 408 across Interstate 4 just south of Anderson Street. The interchange – a double trumpet – connected to I-4 south of Gore Street, and resulted in the closure of four of the six ramps at Gore Street, which had intersected I-4 with a six-ramp partial cloverleaf. (The loops were in the southwest and southeast quadrants.) To the east, SR 408 crossed Lake Underhill. East of Goldenrod Road, the decision was made in 1970 to temporarily include three at-grade intersections at Chickasaw Trail, Valencia College Lane and Millinocket Lane.

The west half, from SR 50 to Mills Avenue, opened October 26, 1973. The rest was completed by December 11. The two barrier toll plazas – Holland West and Holland East – each charged 20 cents, while the ramp tolls – present at Orange Blossom Trail, Mills Avenue, Bumby Avenue, Conway Road and Semoran Boulevard, charged 10 cents. The Florida Department of Transportation took over operation and maintenance, giving revenues to the OOCEA. The final cost of the 13.3-mile (21.4 km) road was about $89 million.

Most tolls were doubled on January 1, 1987.

Eastern extension 

Prior to the start of construction on the eastern extension, the Northeastern Beltway (State Road 417) was built north from the existing east end of the East–West Expressway at Colonial Drive. As part of this project, in 1987 and 1988, two ramps were added to the Goldenrod Road interchange to make it full, and the three at-grade intersections were removed – Chickasaw Trail became an overpass, Valencia College Lane became an interchange, and Millinockett Lane was simply cut. Ramp tolls were added at Valencia College Lane and SR 50, adding to the cost of traveling the original East–West once tolling on the new road began January 1, 1989.

By 1984, the alignment of the eastern extension of SR 408 had been chosen. The area was planned to be developed, and the OOCEA hoped to build the road before development made that impossible. Construction began in 1987, and the west piece, from existing SR 408 (redesignated SR 4080) to Rouse Road, opened May 12, 1989. The rest of the six-mile (10 km) road opened in June, with a total cost of $105 million. This project included a full interchange with the planned Southeastern Beltway (opened April 14, 1990), the Dean Road barrier toll, as well as a connection at the east end to the Central Florida Research Park. A wide median was left where the road curves north to end at SR 50 for further extension, but the land to the east has since been developed.

Western extension 
A connection to Florida's Turnpike and the planned Western Beltway was studied in 1985. (The Beltway, which would have run where Clarke Road now is, was soon shifted west.)  Construction on the 4.5-mile (7 km) extension began in mid-1989 and was completed on October 8, 1990, costing $102 million total. The former west end at SR 50 west of Kirkman Road was temporarily designated SR 4081 during construction, and became a retention pond. A fourth barrier toll – the Hiawassee Road plaza – was added to the road. The extension was designed to have a full interchange with the Turnpike, but originally only the north-pointing ramps were built. The full interchange with the Turnpike was completed in August 2006.  A temporary ticket system booth was installed until the Turnpike switched to a coin system in 1991.

Later changes 
Tolls were again raised July 1, 1990, to 75 cents at barrier tolls and 50 cents on ramps. After public backlash, an experiment began October 11, 1992, in which some of the changes were reverted. The Hiawassee Road and Dean Road barriers were dropped back to 50 cents, and ramp tolls at Hiawassee Road, Valencia College Lane, Dean Road and Rouse Road were cut to 25 cents. The OOCEA board voted on June 17, 1993, to make the changes permanent.

Due to confusion resulting from the four named toll roads in the Orlando area (East–West Expressway, Bee Line Expressway, Eastern Beltway and Seminole County Expressway), the OOCEA decided in 1992 to use the numbers that had already been designated by the Florida Department of Transportation (FDOT). The old orange symbol was replaced by the number 408 in the new toll road symbol, recently approved by FDOT. Signs were changed in 1993.

At some point in the late 1990s, the John Young Parkway (SR 423) interchange was completed; it had formerly only had ramps to and from the east.

All the mainline toll plazas were reconstructed with express E-Pass lanes in the latter half of the 2000s. The new toll plaza features three express E-Pass lanes in both directions with open road tolling.

At the western end of the expressway a new set of ramps to Florida's Turnpike opened in August 2006. Previously it was only possible for westbound traffic to go northbound on the Turnpike. A new ramp allows traffic to also go southbound on the Turnpike. Likewise, previously only southbound Turnpike traffic could exit onto eastbound TOLL 408. A new ramp on the northbound Turnpike allows traffic to enter eastbound TOLL 408. New west facing ramps opened in March 2007 at Good Homes Road, joining pre-existing east facing ramps.

Starting in September 2003, a $600 million widening project occurred in the central and western part of the road.  As part of the project, two through lanes were added along the entire length of the expressway from Hiawassee Road in the west to Oxalis Road (just east of the SR 436 interchange) in the east. The section from downtown Orlando to Hiawassee Road was completed in Spring 2007. The entire project was completed in June 2010.

In the summer of 2010, the Expressway Authority began the widening of SR 408 from Oxalis Avenue to Goldenrod Road as well as the widening of the SR 408 Chickasaw Trail Bridge.  This project was completed in March 2012. In addition, the interchange with SR 417 was expanded. This resulted in the elimination of SR 4080 and the interchange with Valencia College Lane. Traffic to Valencia College was redirected to Chickasaw Trail and Dean Road.

On October 13, 2016, Central Florida Expressway board members approved to rename a portion of SR 408 after professional golfer Arnold Palmer. State Representative Mike Miller and State Senator David H. Simmons sponsored legislation for renaming the road, which was signed into law by Governor Rick Scott on June 14, 2017. The section of SR 408 between Kirkman Road and Clarke Road was renamed the Arnold Palmer Expressway on July 1, 2017.

A stack interchange with Interstate 4 near downtown Orlando replaced the original double-trumpet interchange in recent years. The first construction phase began in April 2006 and was completed in November 2008. Due to a lack of funds, the rest of the interchange project was ultimately postponed until the I-4 Ultimate project. Following the first phase, the ramp that originally handled all traffic merging from I-4 only handled traffic from I-4 eastbound, which left abandoned lanes. A ramp stub was constructed in advance of the completion the conversion to stack interchange on SR 408 westbound. The Florida Department of Transportation was responsible for this project. On May 19, 2020, Governor Ron DeSantis formally opened the reconstructed SR 408 ramps with I-4. This was completed as part of the acceleration of I-4 Ultimate improvement project as part of the lack of traffic in Florida due to stay-at-home orders that were implemented within the state of Florida during the COVID-19 pandemic.

Future 
The OOCEA 2025 Master Plan (2000) suggested extending SR 408 further east toward the west end of SR 520. In the OOCEA 2030 Master Plan, this proposed extension was further extended to I-95 in Brevard County.

There were originally already plans in place to extend SR 408 from the Challenger Parkway interchange east to SR 50 (East Colonial Drive) west of the SR 50/SR 520 interchange, which after looking at the receipt of the project, and local opposition, the project was placed on hold by CFX.

Exit list

Challenger Parkway

Route description 
Begins at Fl 408 50 interchange ends at parking lot west of sr 434

See also 
 Central Florida Expressway Authority

References

External links 

SR 408 (East-West Expressway) – Central Florida Expressway Authority
Terraserver "Urban Areas" image of SR 4080 
TerraServer "Urban Areas" image of former SR 4081 
Florida @ SouthEastRoads – Florida 408

408
408
408
408
408
408
Freeways in the United States
1973 establishments in Florida
Central Florida Expressway Authority